Pink Cross may refer to:
a U.S. anti-pornography group, see Pink Cross Foundation
a Swiss LGBT umbrella organization, see LGBT rights in Switzerland